Mahatsinjo is a rural municipality in Madagascar. It belongs to the district of Maevatanana, which is a part of Betsiboka Region. The population of the municipality was 14675 in 2018.

Only primary schooling is available. The majority 85% of the population of the commune are farmers, while an additional 12% receives their livelihood from raising livestock. The most important crop is rice, while other important products are maize, cassava, barley and sweet potatoes.  Services provide employment for 3% of the population.

Infrastructure
Route Nationale 4 from Antananarivo to Mahajanga.

References

Populated places in Betsiboka